Ashley Joy Hoffman (born November 8, 1996) is an American women's field hockey player. Hoffman was raised to the United States national team in 2017, following success in the national junior team.

Career

Junior national team
Hoffman first represented the United States junior national team in 2014 at a qualifying even for the 2014 Youth Olympic Games in Montevideo, Uruguay. In 2016, Hoffman once again represented the junior national team at the 2016 Junior Pan American Cup and 2016 Junior World Cup.

Senior national team
Hoffman made her debut for the United States senior team in March 2017 in a test series against New Zealand in Christchurch, New Zealand.

Hoffman was a member of the bronze medal winning team at the 2017 Women's Pan American Cup.

College 
In 2019, while at North Carolina, Hoffman won the Honda Sports Award as the nation's best female field hockey player.

References

External links

1996 births
Living people
American female field hockey players
Female field hockey midfielders
North Carolina Tar Heels field hockey players
Pan American Games bronze medalists for the United States
Pan American Games medalists in field hockey
Field hockey players at the 2019 Pan American Games
Haagsche Delftsche Mixed players
Medalists at the 2019 Pan American Games
21st-century American women